Caledonian MacBrayne, usually shortened to CalMac, is the major operator of passenger and vehicle ferries, and ferry services, between the mainland of Scotland and 22 of the major islands on Scotland's west coast. Since 2006, the company's official name has been CalMac Ferries Ltd, although it still operates as Caledonian MacBrayne. In 2006, it also became a subsidiary of holding company David MacBrayne, which is owned by the Scottish Government.

History

David MacBrayne

MacBrayne's, initially known as David Hutcheson & Co., began in 1851 as a private steamship operator when G. and J. Burns, operators of the largest of the Clyde fleets, decided to concentrate on coastal and transatlantic services and handed control of their river and Highland steamers to a new company in which Hutcheson, their manager of these services, became senior partner. One of the other partners was David MacBrayne (1817-1907), nephew of Messrs. Burns. In 1878, the company passed to David MacBrayne.

Their main route went from Glasgow down the Firth of Clyde through the Crinan Canal to Oban and Fort William, and on through the Caledonian Canal to Inverness. Services were later added to Islay and the Outer Hebrides. In 1928, the company ran into financial difficulties, and the business was acquired by Coast Lines and the London, Midland and Scottish Railway (LMS Railway). In 1948, the shares in the company owned by the LMS Railway passed to the British Transport Commission, thus partially nationalising it. In July 1969, Coast Line's 50% shareholding passed into state ownership, so that the company became wholly nationalised, and all the shares were transferred to the state-owned Scottish Transport Group.

Caledonian Steam Packet Company

The Caledonian Railway at first used the services of various early private operators of Clyde steamers, then began operating steamers on its own account on 1 January 1889 to compete better with the North British Railway and the Glasgow and South Western Railway. It extended its line to bypass the G&SW's Prince's Pier at Greenock and continue on to the fishing village of Gourock, where they had purchased the harbour.

After years of fierce competition between all the fleets, the Caledonian and G&SW were merged in 1923 into the LMS Railway and their fleets were amalgamated into the Caledonian Steam Packet Company. Their funnels were painted yellow with a black top. With nationalisation in 1948, the LMS and LNER fleets were amalgamated under British Railways with the name Clyde Shipping Services. In 1957, a reorganisation restored the CSP name, and in 1965 a red lion was added to each side of the black-topped yellow funnels. The headquarters remained at Gourock pierhead.

At the end of December 1968, management of the CSP passed to the Scottish Transport Group, which gained control of MacBrayne's the following June. The MacBrayne service from Gourock to Ardrishaig ended on 30 September 1969, leaving the Clyde entirely to the CSP.

Caledonian MacBrayne

On 1 January 1973, the Caledonian Steam Packet Co. acquired most of the ships and routes of MacBrayne's and commenced joint Clyde and West Highland operations under the new name of Caledonian MacBrayne, with a combined headquarters at Gourock. Funnels were now painted red with a black top, and a yellow circle at the side of the funnel featuring the red Caledonian lion.

In 1990, the ferry business was spun off as a separate company, keeping the Caledonian MacBrayne brand, and shares were issued in the company.  All shares were owned by the state, first in the person of the Secretary of State for Scotland, and (after devolution) by the Scottish Government.

A joint venture between Caledonian MacBrayne and the Royal Bank of Scotland named NorthLink Orkney and Shetland Ferries won the tender for the subsidised Northern Isles services, previously run by P&O Scottish Ferries, commencing in 2002. The ambitious programme ran into financial difficulties, and the service was again put out to tender. Caledonian MacBrayne won this tender, and formed a separate company called NorthLink Ferries Limited which began operating the Northern Isles ferry service on 6 July 2006. On 29 May 2012, NorthLink Ferries Ltd lost the contract for provision of the Northern Isles ferry services to Serco.

Restructuring
To meet the requirements of a European Union guideline on state aid to maritime transport, the company's routes were put out to open tender. To enable competitive bidding on an equal basis, Caledonian MacBrayne was split into two separate companies on 1 October 2006. Caledonian Maritime Assets Limited (CMAL) retained ownership of CalMac vessels and infrastructure, including harbours, while CalMac Ferries Ltd submitted tenders to be the ferry operator. Their bid for the main bundle, Clyde and Hebrides Ferry Services, succeeded and on 1 October 2007 CalMac Ferries Ltd began operating these services on a six-year contract. The Gourock to Dunoon service was the subject of a separate tender, but no formal bids were made. In an interim arrangement, CalMac Ferries Ltd continued to provide a subsidised service on this route, until 29 June 2011, when Argyll Ferries took over the service.

Business
The company enjoys a de facto monopoly on the shipment of freight and vehicles to the islands, and competes for passenger traffic with a number of aircraft services of varying quality and reliability. Nonetheless, few if any of the routes currently operated by CalMac are profitable, and the company receives significant government subsidies due to its vital role in supplying the islands: these routes are classified as "lifeline" services. In 1996, CalMac opened its first route outside Scotland, winning a ten-year contract to provide a lifeline service to Rathlin Island in Northern Ireland. This service continued until 2008, when CalMac lost the tender.

Various versions of a local poem (based loosely on Psalm 24) refer to MacBrayne's long dominance of Hebridean sailings:

Several groups have proposed privatising the service, and there has been a long commercial and political struggle with a privately owned company, Western Ferries, which has run a rival unsubsidised service from Gourock to Hunters Quay (near Dunoon) since 1973. In 2005, the Scottish Executive put the collective Hebrides routes out to competitive tender, with the Dunoon route being a separate tender. Some island and union groups opposed the tendering process, fearing it would lead to cuts in services and could be a prelude to full privatisation.

During the tendering period, the company of David MacBrayne Ltd, which had been legally dormant for many years, was re-activated on 4 July 2006. David MacBrayne Group Ltd acquired the full share capital of NorthLink Ferries Ltd, and took over operations of the NorthLink routes on 6 July 2006. Three operators submitted bids for the block of routes, but CalMac retained all its existing routes. During September 2006, David MacBrayne Group Ltd acquired the entire share capital of CalMac Ferries Ltd. Thus, from leaving the hands of David MacBrayne 78 years earlier in 1928, the west coast ferry service returned to the fold in 2006, vastly enlarged.

At the time, no bids were made for the separate Gourock–Dunoon route and the service continued as before. In August 2006, David MacBrayne Group Ltd directed two of its subsidiary companies, Cowal Ferries Ltd and Rathlin Ferries Ltd, to take over operation of the Gourock to Dunoon, and Rathlin to Ballycastle services. Following a European Commission decision not to subsidise a passenger and vehicle service, the route was again put out to tender. In May 2011, Argyll Ferries Ltd, a newly formed subsidiary of David MacBrayne, was named as the preferred bidder for a passenger-only Dunoon-Gourock service. The timetable was extended into the early hours at weekends, with additional sailings integrated with rail services. When the service began on 30 June 2011, preparation of the Argyll Flyer was incomplete, and as an interim measure the cruise boat  was leased from Clyde Cruises.

Argyll Ferries was incorporated into Caledonian MacBrayne on 21 January 2019.

On 14 July 2009, it was announced that CalMac would begin Sunday sailings to Stornoway on Lewis from Sunday 19 July. These had historically faced strong opposition from Sabbatarian elements in the Lewis community, particularly the Lord's Day Observance Society and the Free Church of Scotland. However, CalMac stated that EU equality legislation made it unlawful to refuse a service to the whole community because of the religious beliefs of a part of it.

Routes

Other vessels
 &  are spare and relief vessels.
Two new dual fuel ferries are being built by Ferguson Marine Engineering.
 is due to enter service on the Arran station in 2023.
Hull 802 was due to enter service on the Uig Triangle.
 A contract to build two new vessels for Islay was awarded to Cemre Shipyard in Turkey in March 2022.
 Two further vessels to the same specification as the Islay ferries are to be built at the same yard, to be used on the Uig - Lochmaddy and Uig - Tarbert services. This will be the first time the routes will be separate.

Emergency lifeline timetable
During the COVID-19 pandemic, CalMac operated a much reduced timetable. From 22 March 2020, they provided a turn up and go service to ensure essential goods and services were delivered to the islands. There were no reservations and no onboard retail facilities. Timetables were modified to meet local needs, with occasional additional crossings and extended layovers.

The Portavadie, Campbeltown and Armadale services were cancelled. Crossing frequencies were reduced on other routes, with single vessels at Rothesay, Largs and Kennacraig. On the smaller vessels, vehicle occupants were required to remain in their vehicle.

Unused vessels were laid up:

Passenger numbers

Current fleet

She was built in Poland at a cost of £24.5 million and operates the Islay service.

There are 13 "Loch Class" vessels in different shapes and sizes. These double-ended ferries are mostly symmetrical when viewed from the side, with no operational bow or stern (although in official documents the designation of such is given).  is able to handle Force 7 gales and carry 36 cars and 149 passengers, with a crew of five. Since June 2020 CalMac leases  from Clyde Marine Services for the Gourock to Kilcreggan service.

The company is adapting to the demands of the 21st century. (2000) was designed for the Small Isles service. A new "super loch", entered service in 2007 on the Largs–Cumbrae route.

Two dual fuel ferries are under construction by Ferguson Marine Engineering. The first,  (for the Arran service) was launched on 21 November 2017 but will not be completed until between March and May 2023. Repeated delays saw the delivery date of the second, Hull 802 (originally intended for the Uig triangle) slip to the first quarter of 2024.

A £91 million contract to build two ferries for the Islay service was awarded to Cemre Shipyard in Turkey in March 2022. The first steel for two ferries was cut in a ceremony in Turkey in October 2022, with the first vessel expected to be delivered by October 2024 and the second following in early 2025. In October 2022, it was announced that two further vessels would be built to the same specification as the ferries under construction for Islay. CMAL signed a contract in January 2023 for Cemre Shipyard to also build the two ferries, which would allow a dedicated, peak season services to Tarbert and Lochmaddy from Uig and provide additional resilience in the fleet.

See also

 Transport Scotland
 Caledonian Maritime Assets
 David MacBrayne
 Argyll Ferries

References

Notes

Bibliography

External links

 CalMac (Official) Corporate Homepage
 Caledonian Maritime Assets Limited - website

 
Ferry companies of Scotland
Ferries of Scotland
Transport in the Outer Hebrides
Transport in Argyll and Bute
Transport in Highland (council area)
Transport in Inverclyde
Scotland transport-related lists
Companies based in Inverclyde
David MacBrayne
British companies established in 1973
Transport companies established in 1973
1973 establishments in Scotland
Cowal
Firth of Clyde
Highlands and Islands of Scotland
Inner Hebrides
Scottish coast